Youssef Hamadeh (born 10 August 1994) is a Lebanese former footballer who played as a midfielder.

International career
Hamadeh played for Lebanon in three friendly games in 2014, against Qatar, Saudi Arabia, and the United Arab Emirates.

Honours
Tripoli
 Lebanese FA Cup: 2014–15; runner-up: 2013–14

References

External links
 
 
 

1994 births
Living people
People from Tripoli District, Lebanon
Association football midfielders
Lebanese footballers
AC Tripoli players
Al Egtmaaey SC players
Lebanese Premier League players
Lebanon youth international footballers
Lebanon international footballers